In probability theory, the telegraph process is a memoryless continuous-time stochastic process that shows two distinct values. It models burst noise (also called popcorn noise or random telegraph signal).

and

The process is also known under the names Kac process (after mathematician Mark Kac), and dichotomous random process.

Solution
The master equation is compactly written in a matrix form by introducing a vector ,

where 

is the transition rate matrix.

.

It can be shown that

As , the solution approaches a stationary distribution  given by

Properties
Knowledge of an initial state decays exponentially. Therefore, for a time , the process will reach the following stationary values, denoted by subscript s:

Mean:

 

Variance:

 

One can also calculate a correlation function:

Application

This random process finds wide application in model building:
 In physics, spin systems and fluorescence intermittency show dichotomous properties. But especially in single molecule experiments probability distributions featuring algebraic tails are used instead of the exponential distribution implied in all formulas above.
 In finance for describing stock prices
 In biology for describing transcription factor binding and unbinding.

See also

Markov chain
List of stochastic processes topics
Random telegraph signal

References

Stochastic differential equations